easyCar (formerly easyRentaCar) is a British-based car brokerage firm. It was founded by Sir Stelios Haji-Ioannou in 2000 and formerly undertook car rental services. It is a wholly owned subsidiary of easyGroup.

History
In April 2000 easyGroup set up the company with the only rental car available being the Mercedes-Benz A-Class. 

easyCar Club was launched by easyCar in February 2014 as a peer-to-peer rental scheme that allows members to rent under-used private cars from one another. On 1 December 2018, easyCar Club stopped accepting bookings citing a problem reaching an agreement with an insurer. On 18 December 2018, easyCar Club informed members that it was ceasing operations to join forces with Turo, and offering incentives for easyCar Club members to join Turo.

References

External links

EasyGroup
British companies established in 2000
Car rental companies of the United Kingdom
Companies of the United Kingdom
Retail companies established in 2000
Transport companies established in 2000